The RoverComputers Group is an independent group of companies based in the Russian capital, Moscow. The principal activity of the group is the manufacture and distribution of consumer and commercial electronics and technology under several brand names including RoverBook, RoverMate, RoverPC, RoverShot and RoverLight.

History
RoverComputers dates back to the early 1990s. In 1991 RoverComputers was established as a PC service and repairs facility. By 1995 RoverComputers had released its first laptop computer based on the Intel 486 CPU, establishing the RoverBook brand as well as producing Russia's first ever Russian-made line of notebooks. During this process RoverComputers became  OEM partner of the Intel Corporation in Russia. Today, it remains the only Russian manufactured Laptop available on the Russian market.

Products
In 2010, RoverComputers announced a line of tablet computers under the brand name RoverPad. The line includes five models: RoverPad Air G70, RoverPad Go G50, RoverPad Go G72, RoverPad TegA W70 and RoverPad 3WG70. RoverPad Air G70 runs Windows CE 6.0, while the others run Google Android.

References

External links
Official website
Goodreader.com

Electronics companies of Russia
Manufacturing companies based in Moscow
Mobile phone manufacturers
Computer hardware companies
Russian brands